Ben Ketai is an American film director, writer, and producer.  He directed and wrote the following Ghost House Pictures productions: 30 Days of Night: Dark Days and the webseries 30 Days of Night: Dust to Dust.

Career 
In 2010, the SyFy Channel released The Resistance, executive produced by Ketai, Scott Bayless, and Scott Rogers and directed by Adrian Picardi. It started as a low budget web series in the form of 4 short online teasers on YouTube. Before filming the actual web show, the series was picked up by Sam Raimi’s Ghost House Pictures and Starz Media, after executives at Ghost House viewed The Resistance teasers online. The web show aired on October 4, 2010, on the SyFy channel as a one-hour television pilot. It was also released in its original 8 episodic form on iTunes, Xbox Live, and the PlayStation Network.  "The Resistance" was produced by Aaron Lam, Eric Ro, and Associate Producer Don Le. The pilot made history, as it's the first time a series created originally for the web was premiered on television.

In 2012, Ketai created, wrote and directed an original series for Crackle, Chosen, starring Milo Ventimiglia.

Ketai wrote the script of the real-life project Johnny Frank Garrett's Last Word, based on the life of Johnny Frank Garrett. In the same year, he wrote the script to the sequel to The Strangers, with Bryan Bertino, entitled The Strangers: Prey at Night and released in 2018.

In 2016, the TV series he created, StartUp, starring Adam Brody, Edi Gathegi and Martin Freeman, premiered on Crackle. He also directed and wrote select episodes. Season 2 premiered in September 2017.

Filmography

References

External links 
The Resistance Series
 

American film directors
American television directors
Living people
1982 births
University of Michigan alumni